Sir Raymond Powell (19 June 1928 – 7 December 2001), known as Ray Powell, was a Welsh politician who served as the Labour Member of Parliament for Ogmore. He continued as constituency MP until his death.

Powell, a former shop worker and manager, was sponsored by his trade union, USDAW, and entered Parliament at the 1979 election, after becoming chairman of the Welsh Labour Party in 1977; he was an opponent of Welsh devolution. He was an opposition whip from 1983 to 1995, when he retired to the backbenches. He was knighted in 1996.

He was opposed to Sunday trading and was active in Parliament to block legislation to allow it. He married Marion Evans in 1950, and their daughter, Janice Gregory, was a member of the National Assembly for Wales from 1999 to 2016.

References 

1928 births
2001 deaths
Knights Bachelor
Welsh Labour Party MPs
UK MPs 1983–1987
UK MPs 1979–1983
UK MPs 1987–1992
UK MPs 1992–1997
UK MPs 1997–2001
UK MPs 2001–2005
Alumni of the London School of Economics
Politics of Bridgend County Borough
Politicians awarded knighthoods